Gowen may refer to:


People
 Alan Gowen (1947–1981), fusion/progressive rock keyboardist
 Bradford Gowen (1946–), American pianist
 Clonie Gowen (1971–), American professional poker player
 Francis I. Gowen (1855–1927), American industrialist
 Franklin B. Gowen (1836–1889), president of the Philadelphia and Reading Railroad
 James Robert Gowen (1784–1862) English horticulturist and New Zealand Company director
 John Whittemore Gowen (1893–1967), American biologist 
 Zach Gowen (1983–), American professional wrestler

Places
 Gowen, Michigan, United States, an unincorporated community
 Gowen, Oklahoma, United States, an unincorporated community
 Boise Airport, Idaho, United States, also known as Gowen Field
 Gowen County, New South Wales, Australia

Other uses
 Major Gowen, a fictional character in the BBC sitcom Fawlty Towers
 Gowen Cypress, a tree species

See also
 Gawen, a given name and surname